Moeed Hasan Pirzada is a Pakistani-British political commentator, geostrategic analyst and television news journalist. He hosts a program on 92 News called 'Hard Talk'. He has interviewed many politicians from many different countries, and has written columns for national newspapers.

Personal life
One of four siblings, with a sister and two brothers, his late father, Dr Ghulam Mohiuddin Pirzada (d. 2015), originally from Srinagar, has been hailed as "the oldest physician of Mirpur" in Azad Kashmir as well as "the first highly-qualified medical specialist in Mirpur since the city resurfaced as a new modern township following the construction of the Mangla dam in 1967."

Career
Pirzada obtained his MBBS  at Allama Iqbal Medical College, Lahore, and subsequently secured 17th position in the CSS examination.

These days he is doing Vlog on YouTube covering indepth analysis of the current political situations emerging on day -to -day basis.He has worked with Waqt News, and hosted the Tonight With Moeed Pirzada show. He has also been a Director for World Affairs and Head of Content at PTV News, and hosted the famous talk show Sochta Pakistan, a program on which he discussed national, regional, strategic, social and educational issues with politicians, analysts and policy makers. He has worked with Dunya News-TV channel as a Director for World Affairs and hosted the current affairs talk show Dunya Today. He written for Dubai-based regional paper Khaleej Times. His columns have appeared in major Pakistani papers such as Dawn, The News International, Daily Times, Friday Times and blogs. He has attended national and international conferences, seminars and policy workshops and has been a member of the Prime Ministerial Education Task Force that collaborated with the British Council to produce the Next Generation Report. He has contributed policy papers to the Islamabad Policy Research Institute (IPRI) and also written several policy pieces for Pique Magazine. He is an Executive Director of Governance and Policy Advisors (GAPA), which provides consultancy services to government institutions, development organizations and corporate bodies on issues related to media, governance, health policy and regional peace. Pirzada now hosts program "Hard Talk" on 92 News.

Media achievements

As a TV journalist, he has interviewed Pakistani and foreign notables including Benazir Bhutto, David Cameron, Hamid Karzai, Mahmood Abbas, William Dalrymple, Jaswant Singh, Richard Holbrooke, Mike Mullen and the British politician George Galloway. He has covered the strategic dialogue between US and Pakistan as well as several talks between India and Pakistan, including the meeting of the former Pakistan President Pervez Musharraf with the Indian Prime minister Manmohan Singh at the Non-Aligned Summit in Havana in 2006. He has covered the Pakistani military action in the Swat valley and the IDP crises in 2009. In September 2009, Anne W. Patterson appeared on his program and denied that the US security company Black Water had been operating in Pakistan; a claim that was proved untrue after the detention of Raymond Allen Davis in Lahore in January 2011. When Pirzada was moderating an event at which the US Secretary of State, Hillary Clinton, met young Pakistani civil society activists and entrepreneurs on 21 October 2011 in Islamabad's Serena Hotel, a student elicited laughter by branding the American government as the 'mother-in-law of all Pakistanis'. Pirzada had also moderated Clinton's first controversial appearance with TV anchors in October 2009, when she remarked that if Pakistanis did not want the Kerry Lugar Bill's aid then they should boldly reject it.

Presently he runs a successful youtube channel where he regularly speaks on contemporary political and social developments and shares his analysis.

See also
List of Pakistani journalists

References

External links
 Dr. Moeed Pirzada's official Website
 Kashmir: Indian Strategic Initiative Since 9/11 and Imperatives for US Policy in the Region
 Amazon.com profile
 Chowk profile & article list
 Pakistan: Illusions of reality? by Dr. Moeed Pirzada, Khaleej Times, 10 January 2008
 Independent Pakistan: A prisoner of its own ideology? BY Moeed Pirzada 15 August 2008
 Virtual Democracy Set by Dr Moeed Pirzada 12 September 2008
 Can Obama Come Up to the Expectations of the World? Moeed Pirzada 12 November 2008
 Media under siege BY DR MOEED PIRZADA (World View) 22 November 2007

Living people
Kashmiri people
Pakistani people of Kashmiri descent
1966 births
Pakistani male journalists
Pakistani political journalists
Defence and security analysts in Pakistan
School of International and Public Affairs, Columbia University alumni
Alumni of the London School of Economics
University of the Punjab alumni
People from Rawalpindi